Rabia Qari (also known as Rabia Sultana Qari) was the first Muslim woman barrister of the South Asia and Pakistan.  She was also the first woman elected Lahore High Court Bar Association (LHCBA) president in the 1960s, and the only woman to achieve this until Fakharunnisa Khokhar (or Fakharin Nisa Khokhar) was elected in 2005.

She adopted 5 years old elder daughter of Boota Singh and Zainab. Qari took care of their daughter and she stayed with Qari until her wedding, which took place at Qari's house in Lahore.

References

Year of birth missing (living people)
Living people
People from Jhelum District
Pakistani lawyers
Pakistani barristers